Michael Cart, born on March 6, 1941, in Logansport, Indiana, United States is an author and expert in children's and young adult literature. He earned a degree in Library Science from Columbia University in 1964 and a degree in journalism from Northwestern University. From 1964 to 1967 he served in the United States Army.  Cart received the Grolier Award in 2000 and was the inaugural recipient of the YALSA/ Greenwood Publishing Group Service to Young Adults Award in 2008.

Selected works 
 Cart, M. Cart's top 200 adult books for young adults: Two decades in review. Chicago: ALA editions.  2013
 Cart, M. In the stacks: Short stories about libraries and librarians( 1st ed.). New York: Overlook Press.  2002.
 Cart, M., & Jenkins, C. Top 250 LGBTQ books for teens: Coming out, being out, and the search for community. Chicago: Huron Street Press, 2015
 Cart, M. What's so funny?: Wit and humor in American children's literature(1st ed.). New York, NY: HarperCollins publishers.  1995. 
 Cart, M. Young adult literature: From romance to realism. Chicago: American Library Association.  2010.
 Cart, M., & Jenkins, C. Top 250 LGBTQ books for teens: Coming out, being out, and the search for community. Chicago: Huron Street Press, 2015

References 

1941 births
Living people
People from Logansport, Indiana
American literary theorists
Columbia University School of Library Service alumni